Chen Li-chen (born 6 July 1958) is a Taiwanese politician.

Chen graduated from Chinese Medicine University with a master's degree in environmental medicine.

She began her political career working for the Chiayi City Environmental Protection Bureau and later the Department of Health. In 1999, Chen was named deputy mayor of Chiayi under Chang Po-ya, who she succeeded in office when Chang was appointed to lead the interior ministry. Chen joined the Democratic Progressive Party in March 2003.

2005 Chiayi City mayor election
She defeated Lee Chun-yi in a party primary, and the DPP backed Chen as its Chiayi mayoral candidate for the 2005 elections. She lost to Kuomintang candidate Huang Min-hui, who left the legislature to assume the mayoralty. Chen then contested Huang's vacant legislative seat on behalf of the DPP, and lost to Chiang Yi-hsiung.

References

1958 births
Living people
Politicians of the Republic of China on Taiwan from Tainan
Mayors of Chiayi
Women mayors of places in Taiwan
Democratic Progressive Party (Taiwan) politicians
Deputy mayors of Chiayi City